Pepe Habichuela (born 1944 as José Antonio Carmona Carmona) is a Spanish flamenco guitarist, cited as one of the great  flamenco masters and one of Spain's finest contemporary guitarists. He was born in Granada and belongs to a flamenco dynasty of gypsies started by his grandfather, known as "Habichuela el Viejo" (Old Bean), who took the nickname, and continued by his father José Carmona and his brothers Juan Habichuela (1933), Carlos and Luis.

In 1964 he moved to Madrid where he performed in several flamenco shows and shared the stage with artists such as  Juanito Valderrama, Camarón de la Isla  and Enrique Morente. He recorded an album in tribute to singer Antonio Chacón which won the National Prize of discography in  1975.

He is the father of José Miguel Carmona Niño and uncle of  Juan José Carmona Amaya El Camborio  and Antonio Carmona Amaya (sons of his brother Juan Habichuela). The three formed the New Flamenco band Ketama. In 2001, Habichuela released the album Yerbagüena as part of Pepe Habichuela & The Bollywood Strings, a unique mix of flamenco guitar and Indian string music. He has also experimented with Arabic-flamenco fusion music. He has  been described as "highly emotional" like Tomatito, with one author saying "If flamenco has earned its rep as an overly emotional music, it isn't going to be Habichuela who turns it around."

Principal albums
Enrique Morente & Pepe Habichuela – Homenaje a D. Antonio Chacón (A tribute to Don Antonio Chacón) (Hispavox, 1976, re-released by EMI, 2000)
Enrique Morente – Despegando (CBS, 1977)
A Mandeli (Hannibal, 1983, re-released on Nuevos Medios, 1994)
Habichuela en rama (Nuevos Medios, 1997)
Pepe Habichuela & The Bollywood Strings – Yerbagüena  (Nuevos Medios, 2001)
Nuevos Medios Colección (Nuevos Medios compilation, 2003)
Dave Holland & Pepe Habichuela – Hands (Dare2, 2010)

References

Spanish flamenco guitarists
Spanish male guitarists
1944 births
Living people
People from Granada
Flamenco guitarists